Philippe Villers founded the company Computervision with Marty Allen in 1969.  In 1980 he co-founded Automatix, an early robotics company, which he led until 1986.  He later served as president of Cognition Corporation for 3 years.  He is currently (2013) president of GrainPro, Inc., and board member of a number of high-tech startups, as well as president  of Families USA Foundation, which he endowed. GrainPro makes bags and storage cocoons out of polyvinyl chloride to protect grain in third world countries, where up to 25% of harvested crops are lost to insects and rodents.

Villers was born in France and came to the United States as a child. He earned a B.A. from Harvard University and an S.M. in mechanical engineering from MIT in 1960.  He also holds an honorary doctorate from the University of Massachusetts Lowell.

References

External links
GrainPro, Inc.
Families USA Foundation
Cognition Corporation

American computer businesspeople
Businesspeople in computing
Harvard University alumni
MIT School of Engineering alumni
Living people
Year of birth missing (living people)